Savran is an urban-type settlement in Odesa Oblast (province) of south-western Ukraine. Population: 

Until World War II it had a sizeable Jewish community, which numbered 1198 in 1900.  It had been the center of the Hasidic Savran dynasty.

Notable people from Savran 
 Rabbi Moshe Zvi Giterman, rabbi of Savran and a Hasidic rebbe
 Elisa Lispector, Brazilian novelist and older sister of Clarice Lispector.

References

Urban-type settlements in Podilsk Raion
Bratslav Voivodeship
Baltsky Uyezd
Jewish Ukrainian history
Shtetls